Arthur Lloyd (October 17, 1897 – November 25, 1954) was an American cameraman and cinematographer who worked for Hal Roach Studios and filmed many of the Laurel and Hardy and Our Gang comedies.

External links

Hal Roach Studios filmmakers
1890s births
1954 deaths